The thick-eared bat (Eptesicus pachyotis) is a species of vesper bat native to China, India, Myanmar, Bangladesh and Thailand. Very little is known about the status and ecology of this bat, except that it may prefer to inhabit tropical moist deciduous forests.

References

Eptesicus
Taxa named by George Edward Dobson
Mammals described in 1871
Bats of Asia
Taxonomy articles created by Polbot